Corsino Fernández (12 November 1920 – 6 June 2011) was an Argentine long-distance runner. He competed in the marathon at the 1952 Summer Olympics.

References

External links
 

1920 births
2011 deaths
Athletes (track and field) at the 1952 Summer Olympics
Argentine male long-distance runners
Argentine male marathon runners
Olympic athletes of Argentina
Athletes from Buenos Aires
20th-century Argentine people